The Northern Illinois Huskies are the athletic teams that represent Northern Illinois University (NIU). The Huskies are a member of the National Collegiate Athletic Association (NCAA) Division I and the Mid-American Conference (MAC). The athletic program is made up of seven men's sports (baseball, basketball, football, golf, soccer, tennis, and wrestling) and 10 women's sports (basketball, cross country, golf, gymnastics, soccer, softball, tennis, track, and volleyball). The football team competes in the Football Bowl Subdivision (FBS).

NIU began athletic competition in 1899 and were nicknamed the Profs. In the 1920s, they were referred to as the Cardinals. During the 1930s they were called Evansmen after George Evans. The Husky mascot and nickname used today were officially chosen in 1940.

Sports sponsored
A member of the West Division of the Mid-American Conference (MAC), NIU sponsors teams in seven men's and ten women's NCAA sanctioned sports.

Baseball

NIU baseball started playing in 1900. The program was disbanded from 1983 through 1990. They currently play home games at the Ralph McKinzie Field in Dekalb, Illinois. They have appeared in the NCAA Tournament twice (1972, 1996).

Championships
 1924 – Illinois Intercollegiate Athletic Conference Champions
 1925 – Illinois Intercollegiate Athletic Conference Champions
 1936 – Illinois Intercollegiate Athletic Conference Champions
 1945 – Illinois Intercollegiate Athletic Conference Champions
 1946 – Illinois Intercollegiate Athletic Conference Champions
 1950 – Illinois Intercollegiate Athletic Conference Champions
 1951 – Illinois Intercollegiate Athletic Conference Champions
 1964 – Interstate Intercollegiate Athletic Conference Champions
 1972 – Midwestern Conference Champions
 1996  – Midwestern Collegiate Conference Champions (Tournament)
 2013 – Mid-American Conference West Division Champions

Men's basketball

NIU men's basketball started playing in 1900. They currently play home games at the NIU Convocation Center in DeKalb, Illinois. They have appeared in the NCAA Tournament three times (1982, 1991, 1996).

Championships

 1932 – Illinois Intercollegiate Athletic Conference Champions (Tournament)
 1933 – Illinois Intercollegiate Athletic Conference Champions
 1934 – Illinois Intercollegiate Athletic Conference Champions
 1935 – Illinois Intercollegiate Athletic Conference Champions
 1941 – Illinois Intercollegiate Athletic Conference Champions
 1945 – Illinois Intercollegiate Athletic Conference Champions
 1972 – Midwestern Conference Champions
 1981 – Mid-American Conference Champions
 1982 – Mid-American Conference Champions (Tournament)
 1991 – Mid-Continent Conference Champions
 1996 – Midwestern Collegiate Conference Champions (Tournament)
 2006 – MAC West Division Champions

Football

NIU football started playing in 1899. They have won one National Championship, have won 12 football conference titles, and have appeared in 16 Division I-A and College Division Bowl Games.

Championships
 1938 – Illinois Intercollegiate Athletic Conference Champions
 1941 – Illinois Intercollegiate Athletic Conference Co-Champions
 1944 – Illinois Intercollegiate Athletic Conference Champions
 1946 – Illinois Intercollegiate Athletic Conference Champions
 1951 – Interstate Intercollegiate Athletic Conference Champions
 1963 – NCAA College Division National Champions
 1963 – Interstate Intercollegiate Athletic Conference Champions
 1964 – Interstate Intercollegiate Athletic Conference Co-Champions
 1965 – Interstate Intercollegiate Athletic Conference Champions
 1983 – Mid-American Conference Champions (MAC)
 2001 – MAC West Division Co-Champions
 2002 – MAC West Division Co-Champions
 2004 – MAC West Division Co-Champions
 2005 – MAC West Division Champions
 2010 – MAC West Division Champions
 2011 – MAC West Division Champions
 2011 – Mid-American Conference Champions (MAC)
 2012 – MAC West Division Champions
 2012 – Mid-American Conference Champions (MAC)
 2013 – MAC West Division Champions
 2014 – MAC West Division Champions
 2014 – Mid-American Conference Champions (MAC)
 2015 – MAC West Division Champions
 2018 – Mid-American Conference Champions (MAC)
 2021 – Mid-American Conference Champions (MAC)

Men's golf
NIU men's golf team currently plays its home matches at Rich Harvest Farms in Sugar Grove, Illinois where it hosted the 2017 NCAA Men's Golf Championship. The team won the 1985 and 1976 Mid-American Conference Golf titles and qualified for the 1976 NCAA Golf tournament.

Championships
 1976 – Mid-American Conference Champions
 1985 – Mid-American Conference Champions
 1990 – Mid-Continent Conference Champions
 1991 – Mid-Continent Conference Champions
 1992 – Mid-Continent Conference Champions
 1994 – Mid-Continent Conference Champions

Men's soccer

NIU men's soccer started playing in 1962. They currently play their home games at the NIU Soccer and Track & Field Complex. They have appeared in the NCAA Tournament three times (1973, 2006, 2011).

With the MAC discontinuing its men's soccer league after the 2022 season, NIU will move that sport to the Missouri Valley Conference for 2023 and beyond.

Championships
 1984 – Midwest Metropolitan Conference Champions
 1989 – Big Central Conference Champions (Tournament)
 1990 – Mid-Continent Conference Champions
 2006 – Mid-American Conference Champions
 2006 – Mid-American Conference Champions (Tournament)
 2011 – Mid-American Conference Champions (Tournament)
 2021 – Mid-American Conference Champions (Tournament)

Men's tennis
NIU men's tennis team has had six players qualify for the NCAA tournament, one player twice and another player three times (1963, 1968, 1970–1973, 1987). They currently play their home matches at the NIU West Tennis Courts.

Championships
 1991 – Mid-Continent Conference Champions
 1992 – Mid-Continent Conference Champions
 1993 – Mid-Continent Conference Champions
 1994 – Mid-Continent Conference Champions
 1996 – Midwestern Collegiate Conference Champions
 1997 – Midwestern Collegiate Conference Champions

Wrestling

NIU Wrestling started in 1931, and first started competing in the Division I (NCAA) in 1969. The team had 9 NCAA All-Americans & 96 wrestlers qualify for the NCAA tournament, with two winning the NCAA title. Three other Huskie Wrestlers won the NAIA championship (1958 (@123), 1961 (@167), 1961 (@177))

Ryan Ludwig (three-time NAIA All-American and a national finalist at 157 pounds) is currently in his 3rd season as head coach for the Huskies.  Completed in the fall of 2008, the NIU Wrestling Training Complex features everything a student-athlete needs to reach the highest levels on and off the mat.

Championships
 1985 – Mid-American Conference Champions

Softball

NIU women's softball started playing in 1959. They currently play their home games at Mary M. Bell Field.  They have made two NCAA Regional appearances (1988, 1996) and one appearance in the Women's College World Series (1988).

Championships
 1988 – North Star Conference Champions
 1989 – North Star Conference Champions
 1990 – North Star Conference Champions
 1996 – Midwestern Collegiate Conference Champions (Regular Season)
 1996 – Midwestern Collegiate Conference Champions (Tournament)
 1999 – Mid-American Conference Champions
 2000 – Mid-American Conference Champions

Women's basketball

NIU women's basketball started playing in 1957. They currently play home games at the NIU Convocation Center in Dekalb, Illinois. They have appeared in the NCAA Tournament five times (1990, 1992, 1993, 1994, 1995). They have appeared in the National Invitation Tournament (NIT) two times (1991, 2017).

Championships 
 1972 – Midwest AIAW Region Champions
 1982 – Illinois AIAW State Champions
 1989 – North Star Conference Champions
 1990 – North Star Conference Champions
 1990 – North Star Conference Champions (Tournament)
 1992 – North Star Conference Champions (Tournament)
 1993 – Mid-Continent Conference Champions
 1993 – Mid-Continent Conference Champions (Tournament)
 1994 – Mid-Continent Conference Champions
 1995 – Midwestern Collegiate Conference Champions

Women's soccer

NIU women's soccer started playing in 1993. They currently play their home games at the NIU Soccer and Track & Field Complex.

Championships
 1997 – Mid-American Conference Champions
 1997 – Mid-American Conference Champions (Tournament)
 1998 – Mid-American Conference Champions
 1998 – Mid-American Conference Champions (Tournament)

Women's volleyball

NIU women's volleyball started playing in 1970. They currently play home games at the NIU Convocation Center in Dekalb, Illinois. They have appeared in the NCAA Tournament seven times (1993, 1996, 1997, 1998, 2001, 2011, 2016). They appeared in the National Invitational Volleyball Championship (NIVC) three times (1991, 1992, 1994).

Championships
 1988 – North Star Conference Champions (Regular Season)
 1988 – North Star Conference Champions (Tournament)
 1990 – North Star Conference Champions (Regular Season)
 1991 – North Star Conference Champions (Tournament)
 1992 – Mid-Continent Conference Champions (Regular Season)
 1992 – Mid-Continent Conference Champions (Tournament)
 1993 – Mid-Continent Conference Champions (Regular Season)
 1993 – Mid-Continent Conference Champions (Tournament)
 1995 – Midwestern Collegiate Conference Champions (Regular Season)
 1996 – Midwestern Collegiate Conference Champions (Regular Season)
 1996 – Midwestern Collegiate Conference Champions (Tournament)
 1997 – MAC West Division Champions
 1997 – Mid-American Conference co-champions (Regular Season)
 1997 – Mid-American Conference Champions (Tournament)
 1998 – MAC West Division Champions
 1998 – Mid-American Conference co-champions (Regular Season)
 2001 – MAC West Division Champions
 2001 – Mid-American Conference Champions (Tournament)
 2006 – MAC West Division Champions
 2011 – MAC West Division Champions
 2011 – Mid-American Conference Champions (Regular Season)
 2014 – MAC West Division Champions
 2015 – MAC West Division Champions
 2015 – Mid-American Conference Champions (Regular Season)
 2016 – MAC West Division Champions
 2016 – Mid-American Conference co-champions (Regular Season)
 2016 – Mid-American Conference Champions (Tournament)

Women's tennis
NIU women's tennis team started playing in 1974. They currently play their home matches at the NIU West Tennis Courts.

Championships
 1989 – North Star Conference Champions
 1990 – North Star Conference Champions
 1991 – North Star Conference Champions
 1993 – Mid-Continent Conference Champions
 1994 – Mid-Continent Conference Champions

Women's gymnastics

NIU women's gymnastics started competing in 1978. They currently compete at the NIU Convocation Center in Dekalb, Illinois.

Championships
 1992 – Midwest Independent Conference Champions
 1993 – Midwest Independent Conference Champions
 2019 – Mid American Conference Champions (Tournament)

Women's golf
NIU women's golf team currently plays its home matches at Rich Harvest Farms in Sugar Grove, Illinois where it hosted the 2017 NCAA Women's Golf Championship.

Women's track and field
NIU women's outdoor track and field team currently competes at the NIU Soccer and Track & Field Complex.  The women's indoor track and field team competes at NIU Convocation Center.

Women's cross country
NIU women's cross country team first competed for one year in 1981. The program was reinstated in 1995.

National championships

Team

Club sports

Hockey
NIU Hockey was founded in 1965. The Huskies play college ice hockey in the Mid-American Collegiate Hockey Association (MACHA) conference of the American Collegiate Hockey Association (ACHA), ACHA Division 2 and ACHA Division 3. NIU was an ACHA D2 Regional Qualifier in 2013 and won three consecutive MACHA Bronze Division Championships, from the 2014-15 season through the 2016-17 season.

Championships
 2015 – MACHA Bronze Division Champions
 2016 – MACHA Bronze Division Champions
 2017 – MACHA Bronze Division Champions

Rugby
NIU Rugby Football was founded in 1968 and plays college rugby in the Mid-American Conference of Division 1-AA.  The Huskies are led by Head Coach Kris Osterloh. The Huskies reached the 2013 D1-AA national playoffs, but lost to Lindenwood in the round of 16.

Cheerleading
NIU Cheerleading consist of two teams, All Girl and Large Coed. Both teams perform at football games, basketball games, and at the NCA College Nationals in Daytona Beach, Florida. In 2016, both teams made it to finals with the All-Girl team Finishing in 5th while the Large Coed team place 6th in the D1A Division.

2016

All Girl: 5th

Large Coed: 6th

2015

Large Coed: 5th

NIU Athletics Hall of Fame
The NIU Athletics Hall of Fame first started in 1978. There has been an annual class induction since 1983. Women were inducted starting in 1986. There are currently 207 individuals and 17 teams enshrined in the NIU Athletics Hall of Fame.

References

External links